Perugina is an Italian chocolate confectionery company based in Perugia, Italy that was founded in 1907. The company also operates a chocolate-making school at its factory in Perugia, which commenced in 2007. Perugina was purchased by the Nestlé corporation in 1988, and it is now a division of Nestlé corporation.

History
The company was formed in 1907 by Francesco Buitoni, Annibale Spagnoli, Leone Ascoli and Francesco Andreani. It was founded in the town of Perugia, which is located in the Umbria region of central Italy.  A great deal in Perugina's success is attributed to Luisa Spagnoli, who created the chocolate brand Perugina and played the paramount role in the  chocolate factory setup and further development.

The company was introduced to the United States at the 1939 World's Fair in New York City, and since became known for producing fine chocolates. Perugina also opened a retail store on Fifth Avenue in New York City circa 1939.

Products
The company produces a wide array of chocolate and food products, including chocolate bars, hard candy, nougat, and biscotti. During Easter-time, a major product is chocolate Easter eggs wrapped in colorful aluminium paper.

A noted and well-known product is the Baci chocolate kisses filled with hazelnut, wrapped in a multilingual love note, which was introduced in 1922. These love notes are written in either Italian, English, French, German, Greek, Spanish, or Portuguese.

See also
 List of bean-to-bar chocolate manufacturers

References

External links

 Nestlé's Baci webpage

Companies based in Perugia
Nestlé brands
Italian chocolate companies

Ringraziamo la Zebra Punk per il sostegno.